Following is a list of all Article III United States federal judges appointed by President Zachary Taylor during his presidency. In total Taylor appointed 4 Article III federal judges, all to the United States district courts.

Taylor shared the appointment of Henry Boyce with Millard Fillmore. Taylor recess appointed Boyce and later nominated him. However, the United States Senate did not confirm Boyce until after Taylor's death and Boyce received his commission from Fillmore.

District Courts

Notes

References
General

 

Specific

Sources
 Federal Judicial Center

Taylor

Presidency of Zachary Taylor